Herberstein may refer to:

 Schloss Herberstein, a castle in Styria, Austria
 Siegersdorf bei Herberstein, a municipality in the district of Hartberg in Styria, Austria
 Sankt Johann bei Herberstein, a municipality in the district of Hartberg in Styria, Austria
 Sigismund von Herberstein (1486–1566), Carniolan diplomat, writer and historian 
 Ernest Johann Nepomuk Graf Herberstein (1731–1788), the first bishop of the diocese of Linz from 1785 to 1788